Blackout is an album released by The Brilliant Green on September 9, 2010. The album is the band's fifth studio album and their first studio album released under Warner Music Japan. It peaked at #16 on the Oricon weekly albums chart.

Track listing

Notes

Charts

External links
 Official Site

2010 albums
The Brilliant Green albums
Warner Music Japan albums